The Ozark cavefish, Amblyopsis rosae, is a small subterranean freshwater fish endemic to the United States. It has been listed as a threatened species in the US since 1984; the IUCN currently lists the species as Near Threatened, though this was previously listed as Vulnerable (VU D1+2 v2.3) between 1986 and 1996. It is listed as Endangered and Threatened by the Missouri Department of Conservation.

Description
The head is flattened, and it has a slightly protruding lower jaw. The fish has no pelvic fin; the dorsal and anal fins are farther back than on most fish. It has only rudimentary eyes and no optic nerve. The Ozark cavefish lives only in caves. It has no pigmentation and has lost some unused characters. However, it is well adapted to a cave environment through well-developed sensory papillae. They feed primarily on microscopic organisms, as well as small crustaceans and salamander larvae. Their reproductive rate is low compared to most other fish.

Habitat

Caves which have populations of the Ozark cavefish all have a relatively large source of nutrients, such as bat guano or blown leaf litter. Water quality in caves containing them is usually high. They are able to tolerate the extremely low oxygen content of ground water found in caves. Cavefish tend to occur in flowing cave streams as opposed to quiet pools.  The Ozark cavefish can receive nutrients from the tree roots above the cave. The roots are full of nutrients and water. The roots spread photosynthetic products in the cave, so organisms like Ozark cavefish and other species are able to feed on the roots.

Distribution

The geographic distribution of Ozark cavefish consists of northeastern Oklahoma, northwestern Arkansas, and southwestern Missouri. The fish is native to the Springfield Plateau of the Ozark Highlands. Currently, 15 caves in this area have verified populations. In Oklahoma, populations are known to occur in Delaware County. Historical records for Ottawa and Mayes Counties also indicate populations. Factors that have led to the decline of the Ozark cavefish include destruction of habitat, collecting of specimens, and disturbance by spelunkers.

See also
 Ozark Cavefish National Wildlife Refuge

References

External links
 Endangered Species Guidesheet, Missouri Department of Conservation
 Ghost Fish of the Ozarks, by Tracy Crede

Amblyopsidae
Cave fish
Endemic fauna of the United States
Freshwater fish of the Southeastern United States
Fauna of the Plains-Midwest (United States)
ESA threatened species
Fish described in 1898
Taxa named by Carl H. Eigenmann
Taxobox binomials not recognized by IUCN